Tizi Ouzou is one of the largest cities of Algeria.

Tizi Ouzou may also refer to:

People
Kaci Tizi Ouzou, a comedian in Algeria.

Places

Algeria
Tizi Ouzou, Commune in Algeria.
Daïra of Tizi Ouzou, Daïra in Algeria.
Tizi Ouzou Province, Province in Algeria.
Municipalities of the wilaya of Tizi Ouzou: Municipalities in Algeria.
Districts of the wilaya of Tizi Ouzou: Districts in Algeria.
University Hospital of Tizi Ouzou: Hospital center in Algeria.
Sanatorium of Tizi Ouzou: Sanatorium in Algeria.
Tizi Ouzou Peninsula Motorway: Highway in Algeria.

See also